Gui Rochat (Guillaume Frédéric Rochat, born 1933) is an international private art dealer and consultant, dealing primarily in seventeenth- and eighteenth-century French paintings and drawings, working from New York as "Gui Rochat Old Masters". His long experience with four art auction houses, Sotheby's, Phillips, Son & Neale, Butterfields (now Bonhams) and Doyle New York has given him the background for rescuing a number of Old Master paintings from oblivion. He is proud to have Antoine Le Grand Batard de Bourgogne (1421-1504) *, painted by Rogier van der Weyden as well as by Hans Memling, as a direct ancestor.

Early life and education

Listed in the Who is Who in the East 1986/7, he was born in 1933 on Java, then the Dutch East Indies, grandson of Prof. Guillaume Frédéric Rochat (1876–1965) and son of Dr. Guillaume Frédéric Rochat and attorney-at-law Bertha Rochat. Gui Rochat was educated at the Latin and Greek Gymnasium school in Zwolle, The Netherlands, from 1946 to 1953, after which he entered the Dutch navy in the training program for reserve lieutenant. Following a short unsuccessful spell of being a cadet in the Dutch Naval Academy he entered Groningen University in the Netherlands 1956 as a student in Medicine. This not being a career he desired, his parents who were living then in Iran sent him to the American University of Beirut, Lebanon, where he graduated in 1960 with a major in Experimental Psychology. This enabled him to continue his graduate studies at Indiana University, where he met his late wife Katherine McCollum. They have one child, Corinne Elise Alexandra.

Professional career in the Fine Arts

After completing a training program at Sotheby's New York City, he was sent as the director for the South-East to Houston, Texas, in 1970/71, where he ran Sotheby's gallery in the Galleria Post Oak. He was instrumental in selling several Post-Impressionist paintings which now form part of the Beck and Law Collections in the Houston Museum *. Thereafter he was trained in the Old Master and 19th-Century painting departments at Sotheby's, London, after which he entered their Old Master painting department in New York till 1974. He joined Philips, Son & Neale in 1979 as the Fine Art consultant and became president in 1981 at their New York location, the Rhinelander mansion on Madison Avenue, during which he catalogued the fine art from the estate of Elizabeth Fuller Chapman *.

He was given a one-man exhibition of his private collection of European art glass in the New Orleans Museum of Art in 1986 and was invited to write an article on a recently acquired large portrait of Louis XVI, an autograph version of the Versailles portrait by the painter Antoine-François Callet.  In 1989 he was appointed director of Fine Arts at Butterfield & Butterfield in San Francisco and became a vice-president in 1990. There he considerably increased the volume of sales and appraised the very important fine art in the Elise S. Haas estate, now in the Museum of Modern Art in San Francisco *, which included the famous portrait of his wife in a blue hat by Matisse from 1905, Matisse's portraits of Leo and Sarah Stein and the sculpture "La Négresse Blanche" by Brâncuși. Rochat also catalogued the fine art in the estate of composer Edgard Varèse and Louise Varèse.

Rochat discovered works by such artists as Giorgio de Chirico, Yves Tanguy, Pierre Soulages and Amedeo Modigliani, hidden theretofore in Western collections. In 2005/6 he became Fine Arts consultant at DoyleNewYork, where again he made discoveries such as a rare drawing by Egon Schiele, now in the Neue Galerie museum  in New York and an important small panel by Joaquín Sorolla y Bastida, circa 1900 of the beach at San Sébastian, with the image of his wife in the foreground.

Private career in the Fine Arts

Gui Rochat has made some remarkable discoveries of disappeared and unrecognized Old Master paintings and drawings, i.e. European paintings created before circa 1800 during his activities as a private Old Master painting and drawing dealer.    

Examples of these are two canvases by the French/Italian master Michele DeSubleay (or Michele Desubleo) *, both now illustrated in color in the catalogue raisonné of his work, one of which was already recorded as lost, mentioned in his testament (cf Thieme Becker and Milantoni). And an important large oil on paper study for an unknown altar painting of the Martyrdom of Saint Bartholomew by Antoine Rivalz :fr:Antoine Rivalz *, acquired by the Musée des Augustins  in Toulouse, France, also fully illustrated and described in the catalogue raisonné on the artist. 

Rochat found a superb pair of red chalk drawings by François Boucher, after a painting by Francesco Solimena, that formed part of the collection of Cardinal Fesch, the uncle of Napoleon, now housed in the cardinal's museum palace in Ajaccio, Corsica *. They proved a fact which was not known till then that Boucher on his voyage to Italy had stopped in Venice probably around 1730, where the Solimena work was then still hanging in the Baglioni collection. These drawings are now both in Ajaccio.

The National Gallery of Scotland *  acquired a rediscovered strong oil sketch of a young woman in profile by the Flemish artist François-Joseph Navez, a pupil of Jacques-Louis David, and a significant and beautiful oil sketch of Achilles presenting the body of Hector to the deceased Patroclus by the French/Flemish artist Joseph-Benoît Suvée * , a later and changed version of his work in the Louvre is now in a European private collection and will be included in the forthcoming catalogue raisonne by Drs. Join-Lambert and Leclair. The Montreal Museum of Fine Arts * bought in 2008 a significant small oil on copper of the Virgin and Christ by the forerunner of Canadian art, the French monk Frère Luc, who entered a Quebec monastery in the late 17th century.

A more recent discovery is that of a drawing preparatory for an engraving by Claudine Bouzonnet-Stella *, the niece of the more famous French artist Jacques Stella, who was a close friend of Nicolas Poussin when both worked in Italy. Stella had bought a beautiful painting by Poussin of Venus giving arms to Aeneas, which is now in the museum in Rouen and on his death it was inherited by Bouzonnet Stella, who was an excellent engraver. This drawing was done by her from the painting and squared for transfer, i.e. for being engraved.

Aside from his interest in French Old Masters, Gui Rochat discovered in New York for a collector a very large and important work by the Dutch master Abraham Bloemaert fully signed and dated 1624, which was offered by Sotheby's New York in a very dirty condition as attributed to Bloemaert's son, a much lesser painter. The signature and date appeared after cleaning of the painting. In the Braith-Mali Museum at Biberach * in Germany is now a rediscovered small copper by the German master Johann Heinrich Schönfeld * of Alexander offering Campaspe to Apelles. And the Rijksmuseum in Amsterdam acquired a very charming drawing in red chalk of a young woman looking at an engraving, recognized as by the 18th-century Dutch artist Gijsbertus van der Berg.

Also among the most recent discoveries is a small but very fine oil on copper by the baroque French artist Jacques de Létin * of Saint Catherine of Alexandria, which is now in the Musee des Beaux-Arts in Troyes, France, and a very rare discovery of "The Calling of Saint James the Greater" by Claude-Guy Hallé (catalogue raisonné on the artist by Nicole Willk-Brocard, 1995, p. 286, number C 42 listed as lost).

It was on loan to the Los Angeles County Museum of Art in 2013.

More recently was discovered a large ‘Penitent Saint Dominic’ now in a major Paris collection, which is described by Robert Fohr in his 2018 magnificent book on Georges de La Tour. He received for this book the Marmottan prize from the Paris Academy of Fine Arts (see the Wikipedia entry for Robert Fohr). Fohr describes the painting  as a possible copy from a late work by Georges de La Tour, but it is probably in fact an autograph work.

Gui Rochat is mentioned in the literature and on the internet (see references and notes).

Associations and references in literature

Gui Rochat has been a member of the Société de l’Histoire de l’Art français  since 1997

Alliance française, The Netherlands, First prize 1951 article on France.

Philips, New York, "The Collection of the late Elizabeth Fuller Chapman", March 3, 1981

Times Picayune, New Orleans, Louisiana, Fine Arts editor "A small and significant exhibition of a private collection of European Art Glass" at the Delgado Museum, May 17, 1986.

Gui Rochat, "Antoine-François Callet, Portrait of Louis XVI", article in the Arts Quarterly bulletin of the New Orleans Museum of Art for the 3rd quarter1987.

Felicity Mason/Anne Cumming, The Love Quest, London: Peter Owen, 1991

Rijksmuseum, Amsterdam, The Netherlands bulletin, summer 1997, number 3, p. 239

La Revue du Louvre et des Musées de France, December 1999, p. 77, number 12

La Revue du Louvre et des Musées de France, December 2000, p. 82, numbers 18 and 19.

La Tribune de l’Art, internet publication, France, several times, 2004–present

Alberto Cottino, "Michele Desubleo, a catalogue raisonné", Turin 2001, color illus. XXXI, p. 123, number 57 and p. 85, color illus. XXXIV, p. 128, number 64

Beverley Schreiber Jacoby, "Early drawings by François Boucher", PhD thesis, p. 247, numbers II B 3 and II B 4

Beverley Schreiber Jacoby, "François Boucher", Master Drawings, 2001, vol. 39, number 3

Edgard Munhall. Greuze the draftsman, Frick Collection, 2002, p. 8

Denis Coekelberghs, ‘Schnetz, Géricault ?, Navez tout simplement’, Gazette des beaux-arts, February 2002, p. 282

Alastair Laing, The Drawings of François Boucher, Frick Collection, 2003, p. 9

Françoise Jolie & Jean-François Méjanes,’François Boucher, hier et aujourd’hui’, publ. Louvre, 2003/4, pp. 46–48, entries 14 and 15, illus. in color

Jean Pénent, ‘Antoine Rivalz, le Romain de Toulouse’, Toulouse 2004, p. 43 illus. in color, p. 47, pp. 144–145, number 43, illus. in color

Denis Coekelberghs, "Les peintres Belges à Rome aux XVIIIe et XIXe siècles", note 100, p. 283

Denis Coekelberghs, "Lettres d’Alexandre Bénard à François-Joseph Navez", Les Cahiers d’Histoire de l’Art, 2006, illus. in color p. 94, fig. 6, note 70, p. 117

Dr. Alfred Bader, Chemistry and Art, Further Adventures of a Chemist Collector, London: Weidenfeld, 2008, pp. 84–86,  "Bloemaert, Lot and His Daughters", p. 87, illus. in color pl. 35

Paola Bassani Pacht, Pierre Brebiette, Neptune calmant la tempete, Galerie Alexis Bordes, Paris, November 2014.

Alexandra Zvereva, Le Gout Francais, Galerie Alexis Bordes, Paris, November 2015 (Charles Poerson)

Robert Fohr, Georges de La Tour, le maître des nuits, Cohen & Cohen, Paris, 2018, full page color illustration and description on pages 254, 255, number 80 and page 310. ("D’après Georges de La Tour, Saint Dominique en prière devant un crucifix, huile sur toile, 101 x 81 cm. En haut ȧ gauche, blason de l’Ordre des Dominicains. New York, Gui Rochat").

Notes
 Didier Rykner, "Nouvelles Brèves – Acquisitions – Edimbourg, National Gallery of Scotland", La Tribune de l’Art, 25/6/04
 Sylvain Kerspern, "Retour sur l’exposition Bossuet, suite: du nouveau pour Prévost et Licherie", La Tribune de l’Art, 12/11/04
 Sylvain Kerspern, "Le Brun enigmatique, Le Supplice de Mezence, enjeux d'une esquisse"
 Didier Rykner, "Un important Vouet italien inédit refait surface dans une vente aux enchères américaine", La Tribune de l’Art, 18/9/06
 Didier Rykner, "Réapparition du morceasu d’agrément d’Antoine Callet" , La Tribune de l’Art, 14/11/07
 Denis Coekelberghs, François-Joseph Navez. "Quelques nouveaux tableaux, dessins et autres documents", La Tribune de l’Art, 29/2/08
 Didier Rykner, "Tableaux récemment acquis par le Musée des Beaux-Arts de Montréal", La Tribune de l’Art, 17/4/08
 "Un nouveau Jacques de Létin pour le Musée des Beaux-Arts de Troyes", La Tribune de l’Art, 16/7/13
 Beverly Schreiber Jacoby, ‘Newly discovered early chalk drawings by Boucher’, Master Drawings, Vol. 39, no. 3 (Autumn, 2001), pp. 300–306 “I would like to thank Gui Rochat, New York, for bringing these studies to my attention and Jean-Marc. Olivesi, conservator at the Musee Fesch, for providing me… etc."
 Marion Maneker, Art Market Monitor, December 15, 2010, Poussin Post Mortem’ “On the other hand, New York Old Masters dealer Gui Rochat thought quality might have had something to do with the Poussin result, calling the picture “not terribly appealing.”"
 Jérôme Montcouquiol, ‘Quelques petits format de Frère Luc’ (1614-1685), La Tribune de l’Art, June 9, 2012, « La galerie Gui Rochat à New York présente actuellement un petit cuivre représentant Saint Guillaume d’Aquitaine (ill. 17), qui a bénéficié d’une étude par Sylvain Kerspern » 
 Didier Rykner, La Tribune de l’Art, November 18, 2007, ‘Reappearance of Antoine Callet’s morceau d’agrément’, « "Acknowledgements : Gui Rochat" »
 Ilona van Tuinen, edited by Arthur K. Wheelock, ‘Abraham Bloemaert, Loth and his Daughters, 1624’, The Leiden Collection, sale, Sotheby's, New York, 22 January 2004, no. 24, as attributed to Hendrick. "Bloemaert to Dr. Alfred Bader, Milwaukee and Gui Rochat, New York;" 
 Doyle, New York, January 26, 2011, lot 79 Lot 79: Antoine Coypel French, 1661-1722 The Judgment of Solomon Oil on canvas 45 x 57 inches (114.3 x 144.8 cm), "We also wish to thank Gui Rochat for identifying the composition."
 Paola Bassani Pacht, ‘Per un memoir su mio padre Giorgio Bassani’, April 26, 2011, « Anche Gui Rochat ha vissuto qualche anno a Roma ed è là che ha conosciuto mio padre. Robert Simon, infine, quando era etc. ».  
 R.N. M. van Wijnen, ‘Lot en zijn Dochters’, proefschrift January 18, 2012, “Gui Rochat, Old Masters. Consultant Old Master Paintings and Dr. Bader beschrijft zijn ontdekking" in : A. Bader, Chemistry and Art, Further Adventures of a Chemist Collector, London 2008.”  scriptie-Lot en zijn dochters Rominique van Wijnen (3).pdf

1933 births
Living people
American art dealers